Radcliffe Square is a square in central Oxford, England. It is surrounded by historic Oxford University and college buildings. The square is cobbled, laid to grass surrounded by railings in the centre, and is pedestrianised except for access.

The square is named after John Radcliffe, a student of the university who became doctor to the King, made a large fortune, and left a significant legacy to the University and his college (University College), which is nearby in the High Street to the south.

The centrepiece of the square is the circular and imposing Radcliffe Camera, a library (originally for science) paid for by John Radcliffe's legacy, built 1737–48. This is part of the Bodleian Library, the main building of which is situated immediately to the north of the square. The two are connected by a tunnel and there are many books stored under the square (with space for around 600,000 volumes). These books may be requested by readers. There used to be a small underground railway to transport books between the Radcliffe Camera and the main Bodleian site.
To the west is Brasenose College, one of Oxford's older colleges. To the east is All Souls College, which only has fellows and no students, and is thus largely dedicated to research. A good view can be had through the gate leading to the square, since although these are normally locked, they consist of metal railings. The eastern side of the square forms part of Catte Street.

At the southern side of the square is the University Church of St Mary the Virgin, with its tall spire. This is the official church of Oxford University and is where the Oxford Martyrs were tried for heresy. A good view of Radcliffe Square and the rest of central Oxford is available from the tower, which is open to the public for a charge.

The square is widely regarded as the most beautiful in Oxford, and is very popular with tourists. There are no modern buildings to be seen, so it is also used as a setting for period films (e.g., Young Sherlock Holmes, in which Brasenose featured as Sherlock Holmes' college).

The square was also part of the venue for the Brasenose Quincentenary Ball in 2009 which celebrated 500 years of the college.

Gallery

References

External links

 Views around Radcliffe Square
 360° QuickTime view
 Oxford walks: The centre — Radcliffe Square
  View in Radcliffe Square from The Charm of Oxford, 1920
 360° Panorama showing Radcliffe Camera and University Church at dusk

Squares in Oxford
Tourist attractions in Oxford
All Souls College, Oxford
Brasenose College, Oxford